Maharashtra Times, colloquially referred to as 'Ma Ta' (मटा) from its Marathi initialism, is a Marathi newspaper based in Mumbai, India. It is one of the largest selling daily Marathi newspapers in the country and part of The Times of India group.

According to the IRS 2005 survey, Maharashtra Times enjoys the second largest readership in Mumbai. Other than The Times of India, Maharashtra Times is the only newspaper in Mumbai which has more than one million readers in the city.

Editions
Maharashtra Times has 6 editions from 6 major cities in Maharashtra namely - Mumbai (including Vasai-Virar), Pune, Thane (including Navi Mumbai), Nashik, Aurangabad and Nagpur. In May 2020, they stopped their Ahmednagar, Jalgaon and Kolhapur editions due to Covid-19.

Supplements
 Times Property
 Maifal
 Sanvad
 Mumbai Times, Aurangabad Times
 Thane Plus, Navi Mumbai Plus, Vasai-Virar Plus
 Pune Plus, Nashik Plus, Nagpur Plus

Closed Supplements
 Pune Times, Nashik Times, Nagpur Times, Thane Vishesh (due to New supplement)
 Kolhapur Times, Ahmednagar Times, Jalgaon Times (editions are closed)

External links

Mirror
Times Syndication Service, syndication arm of The Times Group, deals with content syndication of Maharashtra Times.

Newspapers published in Mumbai
Publications of The Times Group
Marathi-language newspapers
Daily newspapers published in India
Publications established in 1962
Newspapers published in Maharashtra
1962 establishments in Maharashtra